"Friend of the Night" is a song by Glaswegian post-rock band, Mogwai from their 2006 album, Mr Beast. It was released as a single on 30 January 2006, and became the first Mogwai single to reach the UK top 40 singles chart, peaking at #38.

Track listing
All tracks were written by Mogwai.
 "Friend of the Night" – 5:28
 "Fresh Crown" – 4:42
 "1% of Monster" – 3:46
Tracks one and three were mixed by Tony Doogan, while track two was mixed and produced by John Cummings.

External links

Mogwai songs
2006 singles
Instrumentals
2006 songs
Songs written by Barry Burns